Astrée was a 32-gun  frigate of the French Navy. She served in the War of American Independence under Captain Lapérouse, notably taking part in the action of 21 July 1781 and the Hudson Bay expedition. During the French Revolutionary Wars, she took part in the Atlantic campaign of May 1794. Astrée was wrecked in 1796

Career
From June 1781, Astrée took part in the War of American Independence under Captain Lapérouse. She was the flagship of a two-frigate division, also comprising , under Lieutenant Latouche Tréville. They engaged in commerce raiding off Boston. On 17 Hermione and Astrée captured the 12-gun merchantman Friendship; the next day, the 8-gun merchantman Phoenix; and on 19, the merchantman Lockard Ross.  On 21 July 1781, Hermione and Astrée encountered a British convoy and engaged, leading to the Naval battle of Louisbourg where they captured the 14-gun corvette Jack.

Astrée was put in reserve in Brest in March 1791. In June 1792, under Captain de Cambis, she escorted a convoy to Saint Domingue. She took part in the Atlantic campaign of May 1794 and was part of the squadron under Van Stabel.

Fate 
Astrée was wrecked off Santo Amaro, Azores on 29 January 1796 with the loss of 138 lives.

Notes, citations, and references 
Notes

Citations

Bibliography
 
 

Ships built in France
Age of Sail frigates of France
1780 ships
Nymphe-class frigates
Maritime incidents in 1796